Espigão do Oeste is a city of Brazil, located in state of Rondônia. Its population was 32,695 (2020) and its area is 4,518 km2. The city is the 13th most populous in Rondônia and 119th most populous of northern Brazil, but nevertheless maintains the 12th largest GDP Rondônia. Has the 40th best HDI in the North and best IDEB Rondônia, possessing incredibly 8 of 50 best public schools in the state. The city is home to the Motorcycling Federation of the State of Rondônia and the current runner-up Football Championship Rondoniense, with Espigão Sport Club. In 1999, Priscilla Giacomolli, representing the city, won the competition Miss Rondônia and represented the state in Miss Brazil 1999.

Reserve Roosevelt 

In Roosevelt Reservation, comprising 2.7 hectares mihões and ownership of Indigenous Peoples Cinta Larga, located in the western Espigão do Oeste, inhabit about 1,200 Indians.

An unpublished study that mapped the mineral reserves of the Brazil, pointed out that the mining of Roosevelt is a rare species. Prepared by Research Company and Mineral Resources (CPRM), the survey indicated that the kimberlite has 1.8 billion years and a production capacity of at least one million carats per year. That number puts the Roosevelt underestimated, at least among the five largest mines diamond s of world. Actual capacity may only be checked with a more detailed analysis, which has not been done because the mining area is located in Indian. For experts, the survey may indicate the Roosevelt as the largest mine in the world.

Religion 

Catholics: 53.94%, evagélicos: 38.36% and other / no religion, 7.7%.
 The city has the largest percentage of evangelical s of Rondônia and the 64th largest in the Brazil.

Education

Students and Schools 
There are 28 schools in the county.

Major schools 

School 7 September: State School pioneer town, founded in 1973. It is located in the city center, which serves about 865 students in Middle school (1st to 3rd year).
Jean Piaget School: State School located in Morada do Sol neighborhood, where 960 students watch. Since elementary school students (1st to 9th grades) and High School (1st to 3rd year).
School Jerris Adriani Turatti: State School founded on 20 December 1991. It is located in Vista Alegre neighborhood, which serves 883 elementary school students (1st to 9th grade).
School Vinicius de Moraes: State School, located in the neighborhood Caixa d'Agua. It serves about 700 elementary students (1st to 9th grade).
School of Paula Fernanda Souza: State School, located in Liberty neighborhood. Serves 685 elementary students (1st to 9th grade).
School Teobaldo Ferreira: Municipal School founded in 1996. It is located in the neighborhood Jorge Teixeira and serves 530 elementary students. (1st to 9th grade)
School Monteiro Lobato: Private School, founded on 16 May 1994. It is located in St. Joseph neighborhood, which serves 301 students. Given students' teachings Child Elementary (1st to 9th grade) and Middle (1st to 3rd year).

IDEB 
Espigão do Oeste has one of the best IDEB (Index of Basic Education Development) state of Rondônia, according to the Ministry of Education the year 2009.

Network municipal

Initial Years (1st to 5th grade)

IDEB 2011: 4,8 (13th best of RO);
IDEB 2009: 4,5 (10th best of RO).

Final Years (6th to 9th grade)

IDEB 2011: 3,9 (9th best of RO);
IDEB 2009: 4,1 (2nd best of RO).
Network state

Initial Years (1st to 5th grade)

IDEB 2011: 5,1 (11th best of RO);
IDEB 2009: 4,9 (5th best of RO).

Final Years  (6th to 9th grade)

IDEB 2011: 4,4 (2nd best of RO);
IDEB 2009: 4,4 (Best of RO).
Public Network

Initial Years (1st to 5th grade)

IDEB 2011: 5,0 (13th best of RO);
IDEB 2009: 4,8 (4th best of RO).

Final Years (6th to 9th grade)

 IDEB 2011: 4,2 (3rd best of RO);
 IDEB 2009: 4,4 (best of RO).

OBMEP 

Schools Espigão do Oeste regularly participate in Brazilian Mathematical Olympiad Public Schools, getting many hits. Since its first appearance in OBMEP in 2005 by 2011, the city won six medals Bronze and 59 Honorable Mentions. In 2008 and 2011 the city was awarded with a Trophy, to get the best grade average Rondônia.

Neighborhoods 

Centre: Motorcycling Federation of Rondônia State, Supermarket s, civilian police, Banco Bradesco, Caixa Economica Federal, Credip, Credi Espigão, Radio Romiporã FM, Municipal Plaza, The Journal Coun South, Hospital San Lucas, Presidio, Road and School 7 September;
Caixa d'Agua: CAERD, TV Tower, Military Police and School Vinicius de Moraes;
Jorge Teixeira: School Teobaldo Ferreira;
Liberty: Stadium, Radio Mega FM, Gymnasium Hall, Stage Events, Club Municipal, Cemetery s, Hospital Municipality, and School Fernanda Souza de Paula;
Address of the Sun: School Jean Piaget;
New Horizon;
St. Joseph: School Monteiro Lobato;
Vista Alegre: Forum Hall, City Hall, Post Office, Bank of Brazil, Supermarket s, Seduc, Public Defender, Public Ministry, Social Security, City Hall, Idaron, SINDSEF, Semas, Rotary Club, Trade Association, Library Hall, Hospital Memorial and School Jerris Adriani Turatti.

References

External links
 Page prefecture
 www.portalespigao.com

Municipalities in Rondônia